Tsimshian First Nations is a treaty council based on the British Columbia Coast near Kitimat, British Columbia, Canada.

Membership

The Tsimshian First Nations treaty council is made up of four band governments including:

BC Treaty Process
In the British Columbia Treaty Process, the treaty council is at Stage 4.

References

First Nations organizations in British Columbia
North Coast of British Columbia
Tsimshian